Gerald C. Duguid (December 22, 1929 – September 8, 1993) was a Canadian football player who played for the Winnipeg Blue Bombers and Calgary Stampeders.

He later moved to the Chicago, Illinois area and was active in further establishing curling at several locations. He died in 1993 and is buried in Winnipeg. His younger brother is world champion curler Don Duguid.

References

1929 births
1993 deaths
Canadian football running backs
Winnipeg Blue Bombers players
Calgary Stampeders players